The Flushing Meadows Corona Park Natatorium and Ice Rink, also known as the Flushing Meadows Corona Park Pool and Rink or Flushing Meadows Natatorium, is a  facility in Flushing Meadows-Corona Park, Queens, New York City, with an Olympic-sized pool and an NHL-standard rink. Built in 2008, the $66.3 million project is the first indoor public pool to open in New York City in four decades. Initially, the building was intended to serve as the venue for water polo events during the 2012 Summer Olympics, but when the city's bid was lost to London, the New York City Department of Parks and Recreation proceeded to build the pool anyway.  The result is an innovative building with 130-foot-high twin masts and a swooping roof form. The masts are an architectural feature extending up into the Queens skyline as well as the structural supports for the cable-stayed roof.  This design provides the clear spans necessary to house an Olympic swimming pool along with an ice skating rink.

The Flushing Meadows Natatorium was designed by Handel Architects in association with Kevin Hom Architects (formerly Kevin Hom +Andrew Goldman Architects).

Context

World's Fairs
The 1939 and 1964 World's Fair pavilions, which previously occupied the site, inspired the architects to design the canopy roof suspended above the natatorium and rink. The World's Fair was a universal exposition showcasing various cultural exhibitions from all over the world. World's fairs have become historic markers exemplifying commercial and industrial successes of various eras.

The organizers of the 1939 World's Fair boasted it was “the greatest exhibition ever held.” They referred to its vast size, the attractive symbolism of the Trylon and Perisphere, and most all for imagining a future after a decade of economic depression.  Known as the Corona dumps, Robert Moses headed its transformation into a new park, for the borough of Queens; and the construction of the fair. The theme of the 1939 World's Fair was: “Building the World of Tomorrow.” The fair was to symbolize the world's faith in new technology and unity amongst cultures. Through the various showcases from different countries, citizens around the world were given a chance to learn about countries that they have only heard of in books and movies. From innovative edible products such as instant coffee, to machines that washed dishes automatically, this fair introduced its visitors to a plethora of technological advancements and new consumer products. The magical and futuristic land also housed new buildings, including the iconic General Motors’ Futurama and Democracity, the core exhibit within the Perisphere.

Twenty-five years later, the Flushing Meadows Park was selected, again to be the site of the 1964 World's Fair.  Americans had a fascination with space and “the new frontier.” The themes of the 1964 World's Fair were: “A Millennium of Progress” and “Man’s Achievements in an Expanding Universe.”  Space-oriented pavilions such as the New York Pavilion, which housed an observation platform, symbolized the growing infatuation with the Space Age.

Role in park revival
The New York State Pavilion, designed by Philip Johnson and Richard Foster, is one of the few structures still standing in Flushing Meadows Park. The oval roof, suspended and cable-hung, was the largest in the world.  The pavilion was praised for its suspended roof and two towers that stood as the tallest structures of the fair. This large tent-like structure may have been an influence on the current Flushing Meadows Natatorium. Today, all these structures are either demolished or left in an uninhabitable, dilapidated state.

Envisioned in 1999 by Mayor Rudy Giuliani and Borough President Claire Shulman to revive the park, the original concept of a moderately sized pool was enlarged to an Olympic-size pool with an indoor ice rink as well.  The building's foundation was completed in 2001 but after the September 11 attacks the project was halted due to funding issues. Finally, in 2003, the Natatorium was designated as the swimming arena in New York City's bid to host the 2012 Summer Olympics. The Parks Department partnered with the Economic Development Corporation and plans re-commenced for New York City to build its first public indoor swimming pool in 40 years. Upon its completion in February 2008, the Flushing Meadows-Corona Park Natatorium and Ice Rink became the largest recreation complex ever built in a city park at 110,000 square feet.

Description

Location
The Flushing Meadows Natatorium is sited along the northeast perimeter of Flushing Meadows Corona Park, juxtaposed between the Van Wyck Expressway and the 1250-acre park greenery. The building mediates an urban environment to the north, which consist of major streets and highways, with the park on its western facade.

Interior design

The rectangular pavilion holds both the pool and the ice rink end to end. This placement contrasts opposing environments: liquid and frozen water, humid and dry environments, bare skin and bundled bodies. Constituents can enjoy the facilities year round. The building, a 110,000 square foot facility, engages its natural surroundings. The curtain wall wraps around the western façade, allowing swimmers to engage with the natural environment outside, from flowering crabapple trees in spring, to vibrant maple orchards in fall.  As users make their way from the lobby to the pool level, they circulate in a spiral path that offers different perspectives of the entry plaza outside and the rest of the surroundings. The large plot of land, which once housed many international pavilions in the 1939 and 1964 world's fairs, has now been paved over with acres of greenery.

The siting and procession of the building refers to the World's Fair that preceded its existence. With entrances on both the east and west side following a radial geometry, the designer draws on the historic Fountain of the Planets exhibition. A plaza is located at the eastern entrance of the building that extends from three paths that circulate to the building's park spaces.  On the western façade, another entrance opens onto a path that leads to 8 soccer fields, the Flushing Meadows Golf Center, the Industry Pond, and the Unisphere, all of which are on the westernmost part of the 1250-acre park.

Architecture

Influenced by the World's Fair pavilions, the 110,000 square foot aquatic center  is the largest recreation complex ever built in a New York City park. The curved suspended roof spans over both the Olympic size swimming pool and a NHL regulation hockey rink.

The programmatic requirements of this complex shaped decisions about structure and materials. Designing the structural system and cable-stayed roof was a feat for Geiger Engineers. The structural engineers developed this structural envelope due to the necessity for a clear span- limiting chlorine from damaging building materials. A clear spanned space proved to be the solution that answered the need for minimal maintenance and avoidance of damage to structural elements. The engineers chose to place the pool and rink end-to–end, so that they would serve, structurally speaking as counterweights of a seesaw. At the midpoint are the “linchpins”: the two 130-foot masts from which the roof is suspended.  The masts are composed of 1-¼” plates that are stacked at the junction of the pool and rink. The masts are designed so that as they soar through the roof, the diameter narrows to accommodate lateral movement.  In order to support the 120-foot-by-230-foot clear spans, twelve cables were extended from each mast to specific connection points on the roof. The twelve 3-inch diameter A586 strand cables are critical elements in connecting the masts to the roof. To keep the roof from lifting, the roof is decked in concrete planks that counteract windloads. The concrete planks sit on longitudinal girders that create the swooping form of the envelope.

Erecting the structure demanded precise calculations. The standards for cable structure construction required that the engineers create a strategy of execution, documenting each step, prior to construction. In order for the structure to be erected, much shoring and preliminary bracing was done to relieve the dead load from the gravity columns prior to cable installation. Geiger Engineers devised a plan in which the perimeter columns were erected first, after which the concrete planks and roof framing were placed, followed by the erection of the masts, and lastly the installation of each cable. The concrete planks on the roof sit on steel framing, including the large longitudinal girders that create the swooping form of the roof. These girders were fabricated with W36x300s in the middle of the W27x194s at the sides. All of the wide flange shapes and masts were fabricated form ASTM A572 Grade 50 steel, while the diagonal roof bracing were A 500 Grade B.  Due to the precisely choreographed steel design, the Flushing Meadow Natatorium received the 2009 Innovative Design in Engineering and Architecture with Structural Steel award. (IDEAS2). The IDEAS2 awards recognize outstanding achievements in engineering and architecture on structural steel projects around the country. The project was judged on structural steel innovation, with an emphasis on creative solutions to project requirements. The form was directly derived from the structural requirements of the program.

Visual interventions within the buildings allow constant interaction between patrons and the outer environment. From floor to ceiling expansive windows in the pool area to the spiraling staircase with windows opening into the park, the building offers patrons different perspectives of environment outside. Regardless of the season, athletes can enjoy physical recreation and the outdoor environment. The building's main façade is cloaked in a single concrete matrix of different aggregates used to form the mixture of surfaces within each section. Tucked between the concrete matrix are multicolored glass tiles reminiscent of the glimmering colors of water. These apertures, which are sprinkled along the building's façade, cast varying shadows on the interior.

References

Bibliography

External links

Flushing, Queens
Sports venues in Queens, New York
Flushing Meadows–Corona Park
Swimming venues in New York City
2008 establishments in New York City
Sports venues completed in 2008